William James Anderson (2 November 1812 – 15 May 1873) was a physician, amateur geologist and historian of Scottish descent.

He studied medicine at Edinburgh, where he obtained the degree of MD. Anderson was a physician in the Maritimes in the 1830s. At that time he developed an interest in the history and geology of Nova Scotia. After a serious health problem he left the medical profession and the Maritimes in 1847. He was in the lumber business in Upper Canada and moved to Quebec City in 1860.

In 1873, Anderson died in Quebec City of Tuberculosis. He was survived by a wife and daughter.

References

External links 
 Biography at the Dictionary of Canadian Biography Online

1812 births
1873 deaths
Amateur geologists
19th-century Canadian historians
19th-century Canadian physicians
Canadian people of Scottish descent
Alumni of the University of Edinburgh
19th-century Canadian male writers
Canadian male non-fiction writers
Tuberculosis deaths in Quebec
19th-century deaths from tuberculosis